The Whaleboat War was a series of actions fought by American privateers in the aftermath of the British victory Battle of Long Island and in the context of the subsequent Northern theater of the American Revolutionary War after Saratoga. The Americans used whaleboats rowed from the New Jersey into New York Bay and from Connecticut into Long Island Sound to capture and disrupt British commercial shipping, occasionally making raids on coastal communities of Long Island. They quickly sold their prizes, dividing their profits with the financier (persons or company) and the state.

See also
Culper Ring
Meigs Raid

References

Campaigns of the American Revolutionary War
Guerrilla wars
New York (state) in the American Revolution
New Jersey in the American Revolution
Connecticut in the American Revolution
Privateering in the American Revolutionary War
Whaling in the United States